Horizon Services, Inc. (HSI) is a nonprofit social service organization providing alcohol and drug treatment and recovery, mental health recovery, and substance abuse prevention services in Alameda, San Mateo , and Santa Clara counties in the San Francisco Bay Area of California. The executive director is Keith Lewis, who has held the position since 1986. Their programs utilises the Alcoholics Anonymous and Narcotics Anonymous models, along with other methods of treatment. HSI is based in Hayward, California, which is a source for some of their funding.

History 
Horizon Services began providing services in 1974, with a contract from Alameda County to provide sober living support services for men re-entering the workforce. In 1980, they opened a women-only facility, Chrysalis, in Oakland. In 1981, they opened Cronin House, a co-ed residential treatment program in Hayward. Keith Lewis became executive director in 1986, and introduced their first detoxification program, Palm Avenue Detox, in San Mateo. In 1989, with funding from Alameda County, they created an alcohol dependency prevention program, CommPre. This program was expanded to now incorporate tobacco, marijuana, prescription drugs, and over-the-counter medication abuse. In 1992, HSI began operating a men’s detox and treatment program in San Jose.

In 1993, the independently founded youth services agency, Project Eden, began to be administered by HSI. It now provides services for lesbian, gay, bisexual, transgender and questioning youth. In 1995, Eden sponsored the first Hayward Gay Prom as an alcohol-free alternative venue to high school proms. Attendees have come from out-of-county districts, and some from other states and the United Kingdom, and is one of the longest running, and oldest, gay proms.

In 1994 they began administering the previously independent Mandana Community Recovery Center. Mandana closed in 2010, due to funding shortfalls. The most recently created program is Cherry Hill Detoxification Services, a co-ed sobering station and social model drug detoxification residential program in San Leandro. It is the only sobering station and detox facility operating in Alameda County.

The focus of HSI has changed over the years, to include a broader range of social issues and populations. Starting with service to alcohol dependent men, it now serves both adults and youth, and addresses both alcohol and drug problems. The program estimates that currently at least 50% of program participants have a co-occurring mental illness. HSI began operating a clinical services department, with staffing by clinical psychologists, in 1996, to address this populations' needs.

Programs 
Cherry Hill Detox and Sobering Station, San Leandro
Palm Avenue Detox, San Mateo
Horizon South, Santa Clara County
Cronin House, Oakland
Chrysalis, Oakland
CommPre (Community Prevention of Alcohol-Related Problems), Hayward
Project Eden, Hayward

See also 

California Department of Alcohol and Drug Programs
Substance dependence
Physical dependence

References 

Drug and alcohol rehabilitation centers
Addiction organizations in the United States
Mental health organizations in California
Organizations based in Hayward, California
Organizations established in 1974
Twelve-step programs
Healthcare in the San Francisco Bay Area
1974 establishments in California